Liam Watson may refer to:

 Liam Watson (footballer) (born 1970), English football manager and former footballer
 Liam Watson (hurler) (born 1983), Irish hurler
 Liam Watson (record producer), British record producer and owner of Toe Rag Studios